This article gives a table of some common Lie groups and their associated Lie algebras.

The following are noted: the topological properties of the group (dimension; connectedness; compactness; the nature of the fundamental group; and whether or not they are simply connected) as well as on their algebraic properties (abelian; simple; semisimple).

For more examples of Lie groups and other related topics see the list of simple Lie groups; the Bianchi classification of groups of up to three dimensions; see classification of low-dimensional real Lie algebras for up to four dimensions; and the list of Lie group topics.

Real Lie groups and their algebras 

Column legend
 Cpt: Is this group G compact? (Yes or No)
 : Gives the group of components of G. The order of the component group gives the number of connected components. The group is connected if and only if the component group is trivial (denoted by 0).
 : Gives the fundamental group of G whenever G is connected. The group is simply connected if and only if the fundamental group is trivial (denoted by 0).
 UC: If G is not simply connected, gives the universal cover of G.

Real Lie algebras

Complex Lie groups and their algebras 

The dimensions given are dimensions over C. Note that every complex Lie group/algebra can also be viewed as a real Lie group/algebra of twice the dimension.

Complex Lie algebras 

The dimensions given are dimensions over C. Note that every complex Lie algebra can also be viewed as a real Lie algebra of twice the dimension.

The Lie algebra of affine transformations of dimension two, in fact, exist for any field. An instance has already been listed in the first table for real Lie algebras.

References
 

Lie groups
Lie algebras
Lie groups